Evan Brewer (born September 23, 1981) is an American musician from Nashville, Tennessee. He is the current bassist of Fallujah and formerly played bass for Entheos and technical death metal band The Faceless. He has also been involved in other bands such as Reflux and the last bassist to be a part of Animosity. He also released two solo albums under his own name. In 2011, he released his debut solo album titled Alone, and his second solo album, Your Itinerary, was released on July 16, 2013.

Biography 

He is a former member of Animosity and Reflux, which also featured guitarist Tosin Abasi and Ash Avildsen (CEO of Sumerian Records). He has a project called Climaxes with Barry Donegan of Look What I Did and Alex Rüdinger of The Faceless, which is currently in the writing process according to MTV.COM Metal File. They have currently only released two songs; "Clock In & Die" and "Meet Me There". He has also filled in for A Life Once Lost and Terror on tour. In early 2011, he joined death metal band The Faceless after the departure of Brandon Giffin, who joined Cynic as a touring member.
Brewer also has a solo project under his own name, for which he has currently released two albums (Alone and Your Itinerary). All the sounds on Alone were created using a bass guitar, hence the album's title. Your Itinerary has more of a "full band type of feel", with drums, keyboards and electronics. Navene Koperweis (formerly of Animals As Leaders and Animosity) assisted in the production process and created the final mix of the album, as well as providing drums on several tracks. He chose to leave The Faceless in October 2014 to pursue other musical interests, such as recording the Primal EP with technical death metal band Entheos. In September 2020, he joined Nashville-based experimental rock collective Look What I Did.

Brewer is a close friend of Regi Wooten and he states that being around the Wooten brothers and their musical community shaped him radically as a musician.

Gear 
Brewer was an endorser of ESP bass guitars. He uses an Ampeg PF-500 head and an Ampeg cabinet for amplification. For effects, Brewer uses a rackmounted Line 6 Pod unit. Other equipment include MXR bass DI, Aguilar tone hammer, Dunlop strings, and Mackie powered monitors. Brewer switched to Warwick bass guitars very recently and currently owns three Warwick bass guitars. As well as his ESP and Warwick gear, he owns bass guitars from a variety of other manufacturers. Brewer uses EMG pickups in the majority of his bass guitars and is an EMG endorsee.

Bass guitars 
 Ernie Ball MusicMan Stingray HS 4 string bass
 ESP classic 4 string bass
 ESP custom shop Surveyor 5 string bass
 Black ESP 5 string bass
 Rick Toone "Sketch" 4 string bass
 Warwick Infinity 5 string
 Warwick Thumb NT 5 string
 Warwick Streamer Stage I 4-string

Discography 
With Reflux
 The Illusion of Democracy (2004)

With Animosity
 Animal (2007)

With The Faceless
 Autotheism (Sumerian Records, 2012)

With Chris Letchford
 Lightbox (2014) (4 tracks)

With Entheos
Primal EP (2015)
The Infinite Nothing (2016)
Dark Future (2017)
Time Will Take Us All (2023)

With Fallujah
Empyrean (2022)

Solo
 Alone (Sumerian Records, 2011)
 Your Itinerary (Sumerian Records, 2013)

Videography

References 

Living people
1981 births
21st-century American bass guitarists
The Faceless members